Rune Belsvik (born 14 April 1956) is a Norwegian novelist, playwright, short story writer and children's writer. 

Belsvik was born in Stord. He made his literary debut in 1979 with the children's book Ingen drittunge lenger. He was awarded the Brage Prize for Ein naken gut in 2000.  He received the Norwegian Critics Prize for Children's Literature in 1996 for Dustefjerten og den store vårdagen, and again in 2001, for Verdens mest forelska par. He received the Cappelen Prize in 1984.

Awards 
Brage Prize 2000
Norwegian Critics Prize for Literature 1996 and 2001
Teskjekjerringprisen 2006

References

1956 births
Living people
Norwegian children's writers
Norwegian Critics Prize for Literature winners
People from Stord